Cinerocaris is an extinct genus of phyllocarid crustaceans known from the Silurian aged Coalbrookdale Formation in Herefordshire, England. It contains the species Cinerocaris magnifica.

References

Prehistoric Malacostraca
Prehistoric crustacean genera
Silurian crustaceans
Silurian animals of Europe